Aclytia pydna is a moth of the family Erebidae. It was described by Herbert Druce in 1899. It is found in Ecuador.

References

Moths described in 1899
Aclytia
Moths of Central America